Richard Wayne Dumas (born May 19, 1969) is an American former professional basketball player.  Born in Tulsa, Oklahoma, he is the son of former American Basketball Association player Rich Dumas.

Basketball career
Dumas, a 6' 7" small forward from Oklahoma State University, was selected with the 46th pick of the 1991 NBA draft by the Phoenix Suns. Just before the start of the 1991–92 season, however, Dumas was suspended from the NBA for violating its substance abuse policy. Dumas played in Israel for Hapoel Holon during his suspension. His rookie campaign commenced 19 games into the Suns' stellar 1992–93 season, averaging 15.8 points and 4.6 rebounds per game while helping the team to a league-best 62 wins and an NBA Finals appearance. Because of his performance during his first season in the NBA, Dumas received NBA All-Rookie Second Team honors.

Following a stint in rehab, he returned in 1995 to the Phoenix Suns, averaging just 5.5 points in 15 games in his final season with that team. Under the influence of head coach John Lucas, Dumas concluded his brief NBA career with a season playing for the 76ers, averaging 6.2 points in 39 games.

He then continued his professional career overseas, playing for Gymnastikos S. Larissas in Greece, Pekaes Pruszków (1998–99) in Poland, as well as for the Westchester Wildfire of the United States Basketball League.

Dumas retired from basketball in 2003.

Personal life
Dumas was arrested by federal agents December 19, 2013, on eight felony charges of alleged Organized Retail Theft. He was taken into federal custody at his Dumas Youth Sports Club in Litchfield Park, Arizona. Dumas was one of 151 people taken into custody by the Federal Marshal's Service. His trial was scheduled for September 15, 2014. On December 11, 2014, Dumas pleaded guilty to theft. On January 20, 2015, he was sentenced under a plea agreement with prosecutors to three years of probation. According to the Associated Press, "Authorities say Dumas stole about $800 worth of merchandise from a Luke Air Force Base store while working with a janitorial service. They say Dumas was seen on surveillance cameras taking cigarettes, alcohol, food, DVDs and shoes."

References

External links
http://www.yumasun.com/news/state_news/former-phoenix-suns-player-richard-dumas-arrested/article_1a5567dd-d02b-54e5-a661-6c226c1d2401.html
NBA career stats @ basketballreference.com
Richard Dumas on '93 @ NBA.com, posted June 13, 2003
Richard Dumas and Friends Athletic Association - Started August 2012
 Hoop PEKAES Pruszków 1998 roster

1969 births
Living people
African-American basketball players
American expatriate basketball people in Bosnia and Herzegovina
American expatriate basketball people in France
American expatriate basketball people in Greece
American expatriate basketball people in Israel
American expatriate basketball people in Poland
American expatriate basketball people in the United Kingdom
American men's basketball players
American people convicted of drug offenses
American sportspeople convicted of crimes
Atléticos de San Germán players
Basketball players from Oklahoma
Greek Basket League players
Gymnastikos S. Larissas B.C. players
Hapoel Holon players
HKK Široki players
Israeli Basketball Premier League players
National Basketball Association players banned for drug offenses
Oklahoma State Cowboys basketball players
Parade High School All-Americans (boys' basketball)
Philadelphia 76ers players
Phoenix Suns draft picks
Phoenix Suns players
Small forwards
Sportspeople from Tulsa, Oklahoma
United States Basketball League players
21st-century African-American people
20th-century African-American sportspeople